Neil Davis may refer to:

Neil Davis (cameraman) (1934–1985), Australian combat cameraman during the Vietnam War and other Indochinese conflicts
Neil Davis (cricketer) (1900–1974), Australian cricketer
T. Neil Davis (1932–2016), geophysicist
Neil Davis (footballer) (born 1973), English footballer

See also
Neil Davies (disambiguation)